Hakim Benchamach (born 12 September 1963 in Bni Bouayach) is a Moroccan politician.  Since 2015, he has been President of House of Councillors.

References 

1963 births
Living people
People from Al Hoceima
Moroccan politicians
Authenticity and Modernity Party politicians
Riffian people